Pieter Izak Broertjes (born 20 September 1952) is a Dutch journalist and politician of the Labour Party (PvdA). He serves as the Mayor of Hilversum since 1 July 2011.

References

1952 births
Living people
Dutch investigative journalists
Dutch newspaper editors
Dutch newspaper publishers (people)
Dutch political journalists
Dutch political writers
Dutch trade unionists
Labor historians
Labour Party (Netherlands) politicians
Mayors in North Holland
People from Hilversum
Utrecht University alumni
Journalists from The Hague